Rhinocola is a genus of true bugs belonging to the family Aphalaridae.

The species of this genus are found in Europe and Northern America.

Species:
 Rhinocola aceris (Linnaeus, 1758) 
 Rhinocola eugeniae Kieffer & Herbst, 1911

References

Aphalaridae
Sternorrhyncha genera